The Church of Saint Anthony of Padua (/) is a Roman Catholic place of worship and a national monument in Sarajevo, the capital city of Bosnia and Herzegovina. It is dedicated to the Franciscan friar Anthony of Padua.

Preceding buildings 

The present Church of Saint Anthony of Padua was preceded by two places of worship dedicated to the same saint and built on the same site. The former was constructed in 1853 as the first Catholic church in Sarajevo since 1697, when the church dedicated to the Blessed Virgin Mary, in the same neighbourhood, burned down during the Sack of Sarajevo by Prince Eugene of Savoy. The newly built church received crosses, a canopy, an altar, a chalice and other eucharistic objects from the French empress Eugénie de Montijo in 1864. The church burned down in a great fire of Sarajevo in 1879. Another building was constructed in 1881, but it was small and humble, made almost entirely of wood and adobe. As the only Catholic church in the city, it was ceded by the Bosnian Franciscans to the first Archbishop of Vrhbosna Josip Štadler, who used it as his residence from 1881 until the consecration of the Sacred Heart Cathedral in 1889. The old church was returned to the Franciscan friars. It was not, however, built to endure for long. By 1905, it had deteriorated to the point where it had to be closed.

Architecture and art 
The demolition of the old church took place in 1912. A new building, an example of Gothic Revival architecture, was designed by Josip Vancaš and erected in its place by the end of the same year. The tower took two more years, however, and the church was not consecrated until September 1914.

The present interior of the church dates from the 1960s. Featuring works of the sculptors Frano Kršinić and Iva Despić-Simonović, and painters Gabrijel Jurkić, Đuro Seder, Ivan Meštrović Edo Murtić, Nada Pivac, and Oton Gliha, among others, the Church of Saint Anthony of Padua is one of artistically most important churches in Bosnia and Herzegovina. The adjacent monastery, built in 1894, houses the main archive of the Franciscan Province of Bosna Srebrena. The church survived the shelling during the 1992–1996 Siege of Sarajevo remarkably unscathed, with significant damage being done only to the façade and the stained glass windows. The restoration was completed in the autumn of 2006.

Present status 

While the monastery church is not presently a parish church, it is significant as a shrine of Saint Anthony. Unique among the numerous churches in Sarajevo, the Church of Saint Anthony of Padua claims to be the "church of all Sarajevans", boasting regular Muslim and Eastern Orthodox attendees.

The Church of Saint Anthony of Padua, along with the adjoining Franciscan monastery, is a national monument of Bosnia and Herzegovina.

Gallery

See also 

Saint Joseph's Church, Sarajevo – another Gothic Revival-style church

References

External links 
 

Roman Catholic churches in Sarajevo
Josip Vancaš buildings
National Monuments of Bosnia and Herzegovina
Sarajevo
Roman Catholic churches completed in 1913
1853 establishments in the Ottoman Empire
20th-century Roman Catholic church buildings in Bosnia and Herzegovina